Mariana Cagnin, better known as Mary Cagnin is a Brazilian comic artist.

Biography 

Graduated in Visual Arts at Unesp, Cagnin currently works as an illustrator and cartoonist. In 2009 she started the manga-style series Vidas Imperfeitas in fanzine format, the sixth and final issue of the fanzine was released as a free PDF in 2012, the following year, the series was published by HQM Editora under the HQM Mangá label, in a total of 3 issues. In 2016, she launches the sci-fi story Black Silence crowdfunding project on the website Catarse, and in 2017, she participates in the graphic novel A Samurai: A Samurai: Primeira Batalha, by Mylle Silva. She is awarded the Prêmio Angelo Agostini as penciller and writer. Also in 2017, she is invited by the Brazilian Embassy to participate in the Gothenburg Book Fair. In 2019 she launches the webcomic Bittersweet, which is nominated for Troféu HQ Mix in 3 categories.

Awards and nominations

References 

Brazilian comics writers
Prêmio Angelo Agostini winners
Female comics writers
Living people
Year of birth missing (living people)